Artashavan is a village in the Ashtarak Municipality of the Aragatsotn Province of Armenia. In the village to the northeast, is the restored 7th-century Surp Amenaprkich Church. The villages of Lusaghbyur and Nigatun are also within the community of Artashavan.

Gallery

Notable people 
Kyaram Sloyan

References 

Populated places in Aragatsotn Province
Yazidi populated places in Armenia